Edward Owen Smith (15 April 1817 – 8 March 1892) was an American pioneer, businessman and politician. He served as the Mayor of Decatur, Illinois, an Illinois State Senator, and as a member of both the 1848 Illinois Constitutional Convention and the 1878 California Constitutional Convention.

References

Mayors of Decatur, Illinois
Illinois state senators
19th-century American politicians
Illinois Whigs
California pioneers
People from Montgomery County, Maryland
1817 births
1892 deaths
Burials in California
Burials at Oak Hill Memorial Park